Julio Hernández (born 20 August 1957) is a Colombian long-distance runner. He competed in the men's marathon at the 1996 Summer Olympics.

References

1957 births
Living people
Athletes (track and field) at the 1996 Summer Olympics
Colombian male long-distance runners
Colombian male marathon runners
Olympic athletes of Colombia
Place of birth missing (living people)
Central American and Caribbean Games medalists in athletics
20th-century Colombian people
21st-century Colombian people